Mark Fanning (born 16 May 1991) is an Irish hurler who plays for Wexford Senior Championship club Glynn-Barntown and at inter-county level with the Wexford senior hurling team. He usually lines out as a goalkeeper.

Playing career

Waterford Institute of Technology

As a student at the Waterford Institute of Technology, Fanning was a key member of the college's senior team. He lined out in several Fitzgibbon Cup campaigns without success.

Glynn-Barntown

Fanning joined the Glynn-Barntown club at a young age and played in all grades at juvenile and underage levels. He enjoyed championship success as a dual player in the under-21 grades before eventually joining the club's top adult teams.

On 3 October 2009, Fanning won a Wexford Intermediate Football Championship title following Glynn-Barntown's 2-07 to 1-05 defeat of St Mary's Rosslare in the final.

Wexford

Minor and under-21

Fanning first played for Wexford as a member of the minor team during the 2008 Leinster Championship. He made his first appearance for the team on 6 April 2008 when he lined out in goal in Wexford's 3-12 to 0-15 defeat by Kilkenny. On 6 July 2008, Fanning was again in goal when Wexford suffered a 1-19 to 0-12 defeat by Kilkenny in the Leinster final.

Fanning was once again eligible for the minor grade in 2009. He lined out in goal in a second successive Leinster final on 5 July 2009, however, Wexford suffered a 1-19 to 0-11 defeat by Kilkenny.

On 23 June 2010, Fanning made his first appearance for the Wexford under-21 team when he lined out in goal in a 2-17 to 2-13 defeat of Carlow. He was again in goal for the Leinster final on 14 July 2010, which Wexford lost to Dublin by 2-15 to 0-15.

Fanning lined out in goal in a second successive Leinster final on 13 July 2011. He ended on the losing side following the 1-18 to 0-11 defeat by Dublin for the second year in-a-row.

Fanning was eligible for the Wexford under-21 team for a third and final season in 2012. He made his final appearance in the grade on 20 June 2012 when Wexford suffered a 3-20 to 4-06 defeat by Kilkenny at the semi-final stage.

Senior

Fanning made his first appearance for the Wexford senior team on 10 March 2013. He lined out in goal in a 0-16 to 0-14 defeat by Offaly in the National League. On 8 June 2013, Fanning made his Leinster Championship debut in a 1-1-17 apiece draw with Dublin.

On 2 July 2017, Fanning lined out in goal in his first Leinster final against Galway. He maintained a clean sheet but ended the game on the losing side following a 0-29 to 1-17 defeat.

On 20 January 2018, Fanning lined out in goal for Wexford's 1-24 apiece draw with Kilkenny in the Walsh Cup final. Wexford won the subsequent free-taking shoot-out, with Fanning scoring the winning point and claiming his first silverware at senior level with Wexford.

Wexford reached a second Leinster final in three years on 30 June 2019. Fanning lined out in his usual position in goal and scored a late penalty to secure a 1-23 to 0-23 defeat of Kilkenny.

Career statistics

Honours

Glynn-Barntown
Wexford Intermediate Football Championship (1): 2009

Wexford
Leinster Senior Hurling Championship (1): 2019
Walsh Cup (1): 2019

References

1991 births
Living people
Glynn-Barntown hurlers
Wexford inter-county hurlers
Hurling goalkeepers
Alumni of Waterford Institute of Technology
Waterford IT hurlers